Edgemont, also known as Cocke Farm, is a historic home located near Covesville, Albemarle County, Virginia. It was built about 1796, and is a one- to two-story, three bay, frame structure in the Jeffersonian style.  It measures 50 feet by 50 feet, and sits on a stuccoed stone exposed basement.  The house is topped by a hipped roof surmounted by four slender chimneys.  The entrances feature pedimented Tuscan order portico that consists of Tuscan columns supporting a full entablature.  Also on the property is a rubble stone garden outbuilding with a hipped roof.  The house was restored in 1948 by Charlottesville architect Milton Grigg (1905–1982).  Its design closely resembles Folly near Staunton, Virginia.

It was added to the National Register of Historic Places in 1980.

References

External links
Photographs of Edgemont in the Library of Congress, Carnegie Survey of the Architecture of the South, 1935

Houses on the National Register of Historic Places in Virginia
Palladian Revival architecture in Virginia
Houses completed in 1796
Houses in Albemarle County, Virginia
National Register of Historic Places in Albemarle County, Virginia
Individually listed contributing properties to historic districts on the National Register in Virginia
1796 establishments in Virginia